The Lahore Literary Festival (LLF) is an international literary festival held annually in Lahore, Punjab, Pakistan. The festival is considered to be one of South Asia's premier cultural events.

The UNESCO Creative Cities Network added Lahore to its number in 2019, less than a year after the head of the UNESCO City of Literature Heidelberg highlighted Lahore’s suitability for the program at the Lahore Literary Festival.

LLF 2015 drew over 75,000 visitors to the halls and grounds of Alhamra Arts Centre to hear various Punjabi, Pakistani and international speakers including Romila Thapar, Abdullah Hussein, Ayesha Jalal, Asma Jahangir, Eve Ensler, Roger Cohen, Mohsin Hamid, Laurent Gayer, Rahul Singh, Hameed Haroon, Yasmine El Rashidi, Naseeruddin Shah, Joe Sacco, Romesh Gunesekera, Ziauddin Sardar, Osman Samiuddin, Mushtaq Soofi, and Aminatta Forna.

Editions
LLF hold annual ticketed editions in New York City with Asia Society and in London with the British Library. These were discontinued during the covid pandemic and are expected to return in 2023. 

In 2021, LLF held a virtual festival featuring Yann Martel, Fareed Zakaria, Wendy Doniger and others.

Past editions have featured Tariq Ali, Vikram Seth, Zehra Nigah, Bapsi Sidhwa, William Dalrymple, Gavin Francis, Amin Jaffer, Shahzia Sikander, Kenizé Mourad, Amit Chaudhuri, Amjad Islam Amjad, Daniyal Mueenuddin, Vali Nasr, Samia Mahrez, Linda Bird Francke, Victoria Schofield, Hugh Eakin, Naman Ahuja, Rachel Dwyer, Tehmina Durrani, Basharat Peer, Urvashi Butalia, Jeet Thayil, Nayyar Ali Dada, Framji Minwalla, Nadeem Aslam, Moni Mohsin, Shehan Karunatilaka, Florence Noiville, Zia Mohyeddin, Rashid Rana, Ebba Koch, Owen Bennett Jones, Sadaf Saaz Siddiqi, Intizar Hussain, Romila Thapar, Aamer Hussein, Namita Gokhale, Shazaf Fatima Haider, Shrabani Basu, Aitzaz Ahsan, Asma Jahangir, Anita Anand, Anissa Helou, Irvine Welsh, Riz Ahmed, Mira Nair, Ben Okri, Michael Palin, Sharmila Tagore, F. S. Aijazuddin, Chief Justice Saqib Nisar, Ahdaf Soueif, Elif Shafak, Osman Yousefzada, Ahmed Rashid, Kamila Shamsie, former president of Kyrgyzstan Roza Otunbayeva, Madhur Jaffrey, Naseeruddin Shah, Tina Sani, Peter Frankopan, Marc Baer, Nobel laureate Orhan Pamuk, Eve Ensler, Ayesha Jalal, Beth Gardiner, Peter Oborne, Lyse Doucet, Saima Mohsin, Attiqa Odho, Hina Rabbani Khar, Sri Lankan First Lady Maithree Wickremesinghe, Dwight Garner, Roger Cohen, Hameed Haroon, Shobhaa De, Fatima Bhutto, Malala and many more.

The LLF was established in 2013 by Razi Ahmed, and is typically a three-day festival, held at the Alhamra Arts Center. In October 2023, the Government of Punjab appointed Ahmed as chairman of the Lahore Arts Council, which is responsible, among others, for the Alhamra Arts Center, where LLF is usually held.

LLF's governance structure includes a Board of Governors chaired by Iqbal Z. Ahmed. The first edition was a two-day event held on 23 and 24 February 2013. The second edition was held from 21 to 23 February 2014. In 2015, the third edition was held from 20 to 22 February.

See also

 Culture of Lahore
 Festivals in Lahore
 Islamabad Literature Festival
 Karachi Literature Festival

References

External links
 
 
 

2013 establishments in Pakistan
Annual events in Pakistan
Book fairs in Pakistan
Culture in Lahore
Literary festivals in Pakistan
Recurring events established in 2013